Laignes is a commune in the Côte-d'Or department, in the Bourgogne-Franche-Comté region in eastern France.

Geography

Laignes has a total area of 40 km2 and an approximate altitude of 220 m.

Near the town hall there is a basin formed by the resurgence of the river Laigne.

Accessibility
Laignes is traversed by RN 965 from Auxerre to Chaumont.

The nearest train stations are found at Nuits (17 kilometers) and Montbard (25 kilometers). There is a bus connection to Gare de Montbard, a (TGV) station.

Neighboring communes

History

Prehistory and antiquity
Refined flints and tombs dating to the Iron Age attest to the antiquity of the site's occupation. The crossing of the roads from Auxerre to Langres and Alise to Vertault made it a very active place for the Lingones during the Gallo-Roman period: an ancient potter's wheel was discovered near the train station bearing witness to the area's artisanal past.

Middle Ages
Merovingian coins were struck at Laignes, especially those bearing the likeness of Charles the Bald. During this period, Laignes belonged to Tonnerre which passed from the Counts of Champagne to the Duchy of Burgundy. To resist various assaults from armed bands that ravaged the country during the Hundred Years' War, the city surrounded itself with fortifications; of which only a single round tower remains.

Modern era
On the eve of the French Revolution, Laignes depended on goods from the Bailiwick of Sens in the County of Champagne and spiritual guidance from the Deanery of Châtillon-sur-Seine, part of the Diocese of Langres.

Heraldry

List of mayors

Demographics

In 2017, the commune had 692 inhabitants, a change of -22% from 2007.

Monuments and historic places
 Église Saint-Didier was designated a monument historique (national heritage site) in 1930. Its furniture and statuary date to the 16th and 17th centuries.
The sculpture at the resurgence of the river Laigne and the basin at the center of town.
 The former Café des Chiens Blancs (Cafe of the White Dogs), now a multimedia library on the main square near the town hall. It was designated a monument historique in 1995.
Old freight station on the line from Nuits-sous-Ravières to Châtillon-sur-Seine.
Old medieval tower near the west entrance of the commune.
The Chappelle Sainte-Marguerite (English: Chapel of Saint Margaret) on the road to Fontaines-les-Sèches.
The elementary school.

Notable personalities
André Metthey, (1871-1920), world-renowned ceramic artist, born 4 June 1871 in Laignes, and died in Asnières-sur-Seine in 1920.
Christine Petit, born in Laignes in 1948, physician and researcher, professor at the Collège de France and the Pasteur Institute.
Doctor Paul Robert was born on Réunion in 1904, physician in Laignes from 1930 to 1939, and killed by the Nazis on 11 June 1944 in Essarois.
André Osterberger, (1920-2009), professional hammer thrower, born 26 Oct 1920 in Laignes. In 1950, he held the French record in the hammer throw with a mark 51.66 meters and had a mark of 52.95 meters in the 1952 Olympics.

See also
Communes of the Côte-d'Or department

References

Bibliography 
 Le Canton de Laignes par les cartes postales, de Jean Millot et XX, mine d'informations sur Laignes et les environs.
 Le Dictionnaire de l'athlétisme par Robert Parienté, extrait in L'Équipe athlétisme magazine du 10 novembre 1971.
 

Communes of Côte-d'Or